The Dominican Republic competed at the 2019 World Championships in Athletics in Doha, Qatar, from 27 September to 6 October 2019.

Results

Men
Track and road events

Women
Track and road events

References

Nations at the 2019 World Athletics Championships
World Championships in Athletics
Dominican Republic at the World Championships in Athletics